Hiw (sometimes spelled Hiu) is the northernmost island in Vanuatu, located in Torba Province.

Name
The island's name Hiw  is taken from the local Hiw language; it is known as Hiu  in neighboring Lo-Toga. Etymologically, these forms reflect Proto-Torres-Banks *siwo, from Proto-Oceanic *sipo “(go) down”, understood here in its geocentric sense of “located northwest”.

Geography

Hiw is the largest island in the Torres Islands in Torba Province. It is situated east of the Torres Trench, south of Vanikoro in the Solomon Islands. The highest point is Mount Wonvara (.

Hiw's climate is humid tropical. The average annual rainfall is about 4000 mm. The island is subject to frequent cyclones and earthquakes.

Vewoag Point (locally called Ngrë Twome), the northern cape of Hiw, is the northernmost point of land of Vanuatu.  of Hiw is a submerged coral reef, Ngwey Gakwe (formerly Recif Giraudeau), over which the waves break.

Population
Hiw has a population of about 270 inhabitants.

They are distributed in three villages, all located on the east coast: Yogwye ; Yaqane ; and the main village Yögevigemëne , whose name is sometimes shortened to Yugemëne .

The language spoken on the island is also called Hiw.

Transportation
The Torres islands are served by Torres Airport, which is located on the Linua island, south of Hiw.

References

 
Islands of Vanuatu
Torba Province